Fenyi County is a county in the northwest of Jiangxi province, the People's Republic of China. It is under the administration of the prefecture-level city of Xinyu.

Administrative divisions
In the present,Fenyi County has 6 towns and 4 townships.
6 towns

4 townships

Climate
Fenyi Country has a humid subtropical climate with abundant rainfall and sunshine, and a long frost-free period.

References

External links 
 Local region's home page

County-level divisions of Jiangxi
Xinyu